Candor International School is a co-educational international school in Bangalore, Karnataka, India that was established in 2010 by Dr Suresh Reddy, the Founder and Chairperson of Saketh Educational Trust. It is an IB (International Baccalaureate) & IGCSE (CAIE) certified school on a 30 acre campus. The school has 650 students from 19 nationalities. Candor alumni are part of prestigious national and international universities such as University of California, Berkeley & San Diego, Princeton University, University of Bath, NUS Singapore, Christ University, and National Law School.

Curriculum
Candor International School, Bengaluru offers international curriculum for all three sections - Primary, Middle and High School. The curriculum also integrates Community Service, Special Educational Needs, and Arts and Sports into its curricular programmes.

The sections in Candor are:
 Primary School (Kindergarten - Grade 5): The school is an authorized school for the International Baccalaureate Primary Years Programme (IB PYP).
 Middle School (Grades 6 - 10): The curriculum for Grades 6-10 is drawn up in the light of the Cambridge Assessment International Education (CAIE) programs with grade 10 students appearing for International General Certificate of Secondary  Education (IGCSE) examination.
 High School (Grades 11 - 12): Candor offers IBDP and Cambridge AS & A levels for Grade 11 and 12 students. At the end of their 12th grade, students write the IBDP or Cambridge AS & A levels examination. The students plan and undertake various interschool and intra school events that showcase the curricular and co-curricular programs at school.

Campus 
The school campus is spread over an area of 25 acres and it also has a 6-acre organic farm. The school has an Administrative wing, an Early Years (Kindergarten) wing, a Primary and Middle wing, and a Secondary wing. Candor has a Wi-Fi enabled campus. The school also has boarding facilities for boys and girls above 10 years.

Facilities 
Facilities at the school include a  organic farm, boarding, music studios, science labs and libraries. Sports facilities include basketball courts, tennis courts, soccer and hockey field, cricket pitch, a baby and half Olympic size swimming pool, athletic track and gym. Indoor facilities include throw ball, snooker, air hockey, table tennis, foosball, chess track and carrom.

Boarding 
The school provides boarding facilities for students studying in Grade 5 and above. Students can choose from weekly and regular boarding, wherein regular boarders stay on campus during the academic year and weekly boarders reside at school from Monday to Friday and return home during the weekends. Candor has boarding capacity to accommodate around 300 students. In 2019-20, the school was ranked No. 7 in India under the category of India’s Top 20 Day-Cum-Boarding School by Education Today magazine.

Awards 
Candor International School has been ranked No.1 in Karnataka and Bengaluru and No.4 in India in Excellence in blended learning by Education world Grand Jury school rankings 2021-22. Candor International school has received India's Top prestigious schools & Preschools Jury awards 2021 in Innovation in education and best curriculum design by Education today. Candor was ranked No.1 school in India for Academic Reputation by Education Today in 2019-20. Candor was featured in Forbes India Marquee Great Indian Schools 2018-19 and Best International Day / Residential School 2018-19 by Times Of India, Education Today, Education World, & Careers360. Over the years, Candor International School has received several other accolades and awards. The school was ranked number 1 in India for Safety & Hygiene, number 3 in India for Campus & Architecture, and featured as one of the top 5 schools in India for Day-cum-Boarding.

References

External links
 
 "Top 5" International Schools in India, Education Today.co
 Mahesh Bhupathi named brand ambassador of Candor International School, Times of India.com

International schools in Bangalore
International Baccalaureate schools in India
International high schools
Boarding schools in Karnataka
Cambridge schools in India
Private schools in Bangalore
High schools and secondary schools in Bangalore
Educational institutions established in 2010
2010 establishments in Karnataka